Collenia is genus of fossil cyanobacteria that form a particular type of stromatolites.

Description
Collenia are stromatolites made up of convex layers flattened in the center, forming columnar colonies. The microorganisms involved were likely photosynthetic bacteria expiring oxygen.

Fossil record
Collenia stromatolites were very common in the late Precambrian, about 2.2 to 2.4 billion years ago.

References

External links
 Geological Survey Professional Paper, Volume 669
 Spencer G. Lucas,Justin A. Spielmann,Patricia M. Hester,Jason P. Kenworthy,Vincent L. Santucci Americas Antiquities: 100 Years of Managing Fossils on Federal Lands
 Stromatolites - Precambrian: Archaean and Proterozoic Stromatolite
 Index of Generic Names of Fossil Plants, 1820-1950

Proterozoic life
†Collenia
Prehistoric bacteria